The Pratt Tribune is a tri-weekly newspaper published Tuesdays, Thursdays and Saturdays in Pratt, Kansas, United States. It is owned by GateHouse Media.

The paper covers Pratt County, Kansas. Sister weeklies cover the nearby cities of Greensburg (Kiowa County Signal) and St. John (St. John News). GateHouse also publishes a daily newspaper in western Kansas, the Dodge City Daily Globe.

External links
 

Newspapers published in Kansas
Pratt County, Kansas